This is a list of monuments that are classified by the Moroccan ministry of culture around Nador.

Monuments and sites in Nador 

|}

References 

Nador
Nador